Nicholas Simon Taylor (2 June 1963 in Holmfirth, Yorkshire, England) is an English former first-class cricketer.  The son of the Yorkshire County Cricket Club stalwart Ken Taylor, he made his debut as a strapping right arm fast medium bowler, and right-handed tail end batsman, for Yorkshire in 1982.  After failing to establish himself in the team he moved first to Surrey for the 1984 and 1985 seasons, before ending his career at Somerset in 1986.  He reappeared for Norfolk in List A one day cricket in 1990.

In thirty four first-class games, Taylor took 79 wickets at 35.12, with a best of 7 for 44 for Surrey against Cambridge University, one of two occasions when he took five wickets in an innings.  He also scored 180 runs at 8.18, with a top score of 24 not out.

References

External links
Cricket Archive
Cricinfo

Somerset cricketers
Surrey cricketers
Yorkshire cricketers
English cricketers
People from Holmfirth
Living people
Norfolk cricketers
1963 births
Cricketers from Yorkshire